In Ancient Rome, the Aqua Alsietina (sometimes called Aqua Augusta) was the earlier of the two western Roman aqueducts (with the aqua Traiana), erected sometime around 2 BC, during the reign of emperor Augustus. It was the only water supply for the Transtiberine region, on the right bank of the river Tiber until the Aqua Traiana was built.

The length of this mainly subterranean aqueduct was 22000 paces (about 32.8 km) and it had arches over 358 paces (about 0.53 km). 

This aqueduct acquired water mainly from Lacus Alsietinus (a small lake in southern Etruria, currently known as Lago di Martignano) and some from Lacus Sabatinus (Lago di Bracciano). This water was not suitable for drinking, however, and Augustus used it to fill his naumachia in Trastevere to allow the public to enjoy sham naval battles. The water surplus was used for the irrigation of Caesar's horti (gardens) and for the irrigation of fields.

Sextus Julius Frontinus ascribes only a meager volume to the Aqua Alsietina in about 97.

It was joined by the aqua Traiana, probably in 109 AD, to share a common lower path into Rome, though their routes are uncertain. 

Some traces of this aqueduct were discovered in 1720. An inscribed stone slab was found in 1887 near the Via Claudia, the only ancient written record of the Aqua Alsietina.

The fountain of the Acqua Paola in Rome, built under Pope Paul V announces on its triumphal arch that "Paul V restored the ancient ducts of the Aqua Alsietina".

See also 
List of aqueducts in the city of Rome
List of aqueducts in the Roman Empire
List of Roman aqueducts by date
Parco degli Acquedotti
Ancient Roman technology
Roman engineering

References 

 Samuel Ball Platner - A Topographical Dictionary of Ancient Rome, London: Oxford University Press, 1929

External links 

 Aqua Alsietina
Photo of the ruins

Alsietina